Dead Inside may refer to:

Film and television
 The Dead Inside (2011 film), an American musical horror film
 The Dead Inside (2013 film), a British horror film
 "Dead Inside" (CSI: NY), a 2008 television episode

Music
 Dead Inside (album), by the Golden Palominos, 1996
 "Dead Inside" (song), by Muse, 2015
 "Dead Inside", a song by Numb from Christmeister, 1989
 "Dead Inside", a song by Mudvayne from Mudvayne, 2009
 "Dead Inside", a song by Widescreen Mode, 2007
 "Dead Inside", a song by XXXTentacion from 17, 2017
 "Dead Inside", a song by Nita Strauss featuring David Draiman of Disturbed, 2021

Other uses
 Dead Inside (game), a role-playing game

See also
 Dying Inside (disambiguation)
 Major depressive disorder